Jiří Kučný is a Czech professional ice hockey defenceman who is currently playing for HKm Zvolen in the Slovak Extraliga.

Career statistics

External links

1983 births
Living people
Czech ice hockey defencemen
BK Mladá Boleslav players
HC Berounští Medvědi players
HC Oceláři Třinec players
HC Slavia Praha players
HC Slovan Bratislava players
HC Slovan Ústečtí Lvi players
HC Sparta Praha players
HKM Zvolen players
Motor České Budějovice players
MsHK Žilina players
Piráti Chomutov players
PSG Berani Zlín players
SK Horácká Slavia Třebíč players
Sportovní Klub Kadaň players
VHK Vsetín players
Czech expatriate ice hockey players in Slovakia